Millie Innes (born 5 October 2000) is a Scottish actress, known for her roles as Maisy in Dani's House and Millie McDonald in Millie Inbetween.

Early and personal life
Innes was born in 2000 to parents Julia and Campbell; she has a younger brother named Murray. Innes attended Rosshall Academy for her secondary education and was trained at the Glasgow Academy of Musical Theatre Arts. She is currently studying at the University of Glasgow.

Career
Innes' first role was in the four-part BBC drama Single Father, as Evie. Between 2011 and 2013, she appeared in Case Histories as Marlee Brodie, daughter of the protagonist. In 2011, Innes was chosen from 20,000 applicants for the role of Maisy in Dani's House, and she played Fiona in a 2013 episode of Dani's Castle. From 2014 to 2018, Innes portrayed the role of Millie McDonald in CBBC sitcom Millie Inbetween. In 2015, she appeared on Hacker Time and presented a Newsround documentary called Being Me.

Filmography

Awards and nominations

References

External links

2000 births
Living people
Scottish television actresses
21st-century Scottish actresses
Actresses from Glasgow
Scottish child actresses
British child actresses